Trenton Independent School District is a public school district based in Trenton, Texas (USA). The district serves students in southwest Fannin County.

Schools
Trenton High School
Trenton Middle School
Trenton Elementary School

In 2017, the school district was rated as "Met Standard" by the Texas Education Agency.

References

External links
 

School districts in Fannin County, Texas
School districts in Grayson County, Texas
School districts in Collin County, Texas